Mario Wallenda (May 6, 1940 – April 12, 2015) was an American acrobat and highwire artiste, a member of The Flying Wallendas. He was the adopted son of Karl Wallenda. He was paralyzed on January 30, 1962, when their trademark seven-person pyramid collapsed in the Michigan State Fairgrounds Coliseum.

References

1940 births
2015 deaths
Acrobats
Place of birth missing
Place of death missing
The Flying Wallendas